Cutts may refer to:

Places
 Cutts, Shetland, a settlement in the Shetland Islands
 Cutts Island State Park, in Pierce County, Washington, United States
 Cutt's Grant, New Hampshire, United States
 Cutts-Madison House, in Washington, DC, United States
 Cutts & Case Shipyard, in Oxford, Maryland

People
 Cutts baronets
 Cutts (surname)

Other uses
 Cutts the butcher, a fictional character from The Adventures of Tintin by Hergé